Awka North is a Local Government Area in Anambra State, south-central Nigeria. Towns that make up the local government are Awba Ofemili, Ugbene, Ebenebe, Achalla (the capital), Urum, Amansea, Amanuke, Isu Aniocha, Mgbakwu, Ugbenu.

Schools
Here are the List of schools in Awka North : 
 Nwaokike Memorial School of Excellence Ebenebe
 Favour of Grace International School, Ebenebe
 Signs & Wonders Secondary School, Ebenebe
 Holy Spirit Secondary School, Ebenebe
 Community Secondary School, Amansea
 Community Secondary School, Isuanaocha
 Community Secondary School, Ebenebe
 Community Secondary School, Mgbakwu
 Community Secondary School, Achalla
 Community Secondary School, Amanuke
 Community Secondary School, Urum
 Community Secondary School, Awba Ofemili
Climate

Awka south in the wet season is usually warm, unfriendly, and overcast and the dry season is hot, muggy, and some times cloudy. The temperature typically varies over the course of the year.

References

External links
 LOCAL  AREAS IN ANAMBRA STATE dated July 21, 2007; accessed October 4, 2007 

Local Government Areas in Anambra State
Local Government Areas in Igboland